Družba Pere Kvržice ("Pero the Lump's gang") is a 1933 children's novel written by Croatian children's novelist Mato Lovrak. The plot concerns a group of children headed by Pero "Kvržica", who secretly decide to restore a disused village mill. It remains Lovrak's second best known work, after his first novel, Vlak u snijegu.

In 1970 the novel was made into a theatrical film of the same title, directed by Vladimir Tadej. In 2011, it was adapted for theatre. It is required reading in the 4th grade in all Croatian primary schools.

References

Further reading 
 

1933 Croatian novels
Children's novels
1933 novels
Novels set in Croatia
1933 children's books